In enzymology, a dihydrokaempferol 4-reductase is an enzyme that catalyzes the chemical reaction

cis-3,4-leucopelargonidin + NADP+  (+)-dihydrokaempferol + NADPH + H+

Thus, the two substrates of this enzyme are cis-3,4-leucopelargonidin and NADP+, whereas its 3 products are (+)-dihydrokaempferol, NADPH, and H+.

This enzyme belongs to the family of oxidoreductases, specifically those acting on the CH-OH group of donor with NAD+ or NADP+ as acceptor.  The systematic name of this enzyme class is cis-3,4-leucopelargonidin:NADP+ 4-oxidoreductase. Other names in common use include dihydroflavanol 4-reductase (DFR), dihydromyricetin reductase, NADPH-dihydromyricetin reductase, and dihydroquercetin reductase.  This enzyme participates in flavonoid biosynthesis.

Function 
Anthocyanidins, common plant pigments, are further reduced by the enzyme dihydroflavonol 4-reductase (DFR) to the corresponding colorless leucoanthocyanidins.

DFR uses dihydromyricetin (ampelopsin) NADPH and 2 H+ to produce leucodelphinidin and NADP.

A cDNA for DFR has been cloned from the orchid Bromheadia finlaysoniana.

Researchers in Japan have genetically manipulated roses by using RNA interference to knock out endogenous DFR, adding a gene DFR from an iris, and adding a gene for the blue pigment, delphinidin, in an effort to create a blue rose, which is being sold worldwide.

Dihydroflavonol 4-reductase is an enzyme part of the lignin biosynthesis pathway. In Arabidopsis thaliana, the enzyme uses sinapaldehyde or coniferyl aldehyde or coumaraldehyde and NADPH to produce sinapyl alcohol or coniferyl alcohol or coumaryl alcohol respectively and NADP+.

Structural studies

References

Further reading 

 
 

EC 1.1.1
NADPH-dependent enzymes
Enzymes of known structure
Flavanonols metabolism